Sergei Appolinarievich Gerasimov (21 May 1906 – 26 November 1985) was a Soviet film director and screenwriter. The oldest film school in the world, the Gerasimov Institute of Cinematography (VGIK), bears his name.

Early life and education
Gerasimov was born on 21 May 1906.

Career
Gerasimov started his film industry career as an actor in 1924. At first he appeared in Kozintsev and Trauberg films, such as The Overcoat and The New Babylon. Later, he was commissioned to produce screen versions of the literary classics of socialist realism. His epic screenings of Alexander Fadeyev's The Young Guard (1948) and Mikhail Sholokhov's And Quiet Flows the Don (1957–58) were extolled by the authorities as exemplary.

During several decades of their teaching in the VGIK Gerasimov and his wife Tamara Makarova prepared many generations of Russian actors. He also taught acclaimed actor Georgiy Zhzhonov at the Leningrad Theatrical School.

In his last film Gerasimov played Leo Tolstoy, while Makarova was cast as Tolstoy's wife. Gerasimov is buried in the Novodevichy Cemetery of Moscow.

A rare glimpse of Sergei Gerasimov can be found in a one and a half minute behind the scenes documentary featured as part of the Coming From The Movies Set series of Soviet film promos. In this piece Gerasimov can be seen in Norilsk on the set of his film Town Planners. It's a story of two young architects struggling to build a new town in the Polar Regions. The film stars Ivan Negonov as the director of an Iron and Steel Works, Anatoly Solonitsyn as architect Kolmykov, Lyubov Virolainen as architect Arkhipova; and can be found as an extra on the 2003 DVD release of Andrei Tarkovsky's 1974 film The Mirror.

Moscow Film Festival
Gerasimov was the President of the Jury at the 1959, 1965, 1969 and the 1985 Moscow International Film Festival. He was a member of the jury in 1961 and 1971.

In 1967 his film The Journalist won the Grand Prix at the 1967 festival.

Awards and honours

 Hero of Socialist Labour (1974)
 Four Orders of Lenin
 Order of the October Revolution
 Order of the Red Banner of Labour, twice (1940, 1950)
 Order of the Red Star (1944)
 People's Artist of the USSR, 1948
 Stalin Prize;
1941 2nd class – for the film Master (1939)
1949 1st class – for the film Young Guard (1948)
1951 1st class – for the film Liberated China (1950)
 Lenin Komsomol Prize (1970) – the creation of films about young people, and the Lenin Komsomol a big public
and political activities
 USSR State Prize (1971) – for the film  The Lake  (1969)
 Lenin Prize (1984) – for the movies in recent years
 Order of the White Lion, 3rd class (Czechoslovakia)
 Professor of the Gerasimov Institute of Cinematography in Moscow (1946)
 Member of the USSR Academy of Pedagogical Sciences (1978)
 Supreme Soviet of the Soviet Union (1950–1958)
 Doktor nauk (1967)
 Member of the Presidium of the Soviet Peace Committee (since 1950)
 Secretary of the Composers' Union
 Member of the USSR Writers' Union

Filmography

Director

Seven Brave Men (1936)
City of Youth (1938)
Komsomolsk (1938)The New Teacher (1939)Masquerade (1941)The Mainland (1944)The Young Guard (1948)The Village Doctor (1951)The New China (1952)Great Mourning (1953)And Quiet Flows the Don (1958)Men and Beasts (1962)The Journalist (1967)By the Lake (1969)The Love of Mankind (1972)Daughters-Mothers (1974)Red and Black (1976)The Youth of Peter the Great (1980)At the Beginning of Glorious Days (1980)Lev Tolstoy (1984)

ActorMishki versus Yudenich (1925)The Devil's Wheel (1926)The Overcoat (1926)The Club of the Big Deed (1927)Somebody Else's Coat (1927)Little Brother (1927)Fragment of an Empire (1929)The New Babylon (1929)Alone (1931)The Deserter (1933)Masquerade (1941)Daughters-Mothers (1974)Lev Tolstoy'' (1984)

See also 
 Gerasimov Institute of Cinematography

References

External links
 

1906 births
1985 deaths
Academic staff of the Gerasimov Institute of Cinematography
Academic staff of High Courses for Scriptwriters and Film Directors
Male screenwriters
Russian film directors
Russian male film actors
Russian male silent film actors
Russian male writers
20th-century Russian screenwriters
20th-century Russian male writers
Soviet film directors
Soviet male film actors
Soviet screenwriters
Heroes of Socialist Labour
People's Artists of the USSR
Stalin Prize winners
Lenin Prize winners
Commanders of the Order of the White Lion
Recipients of the Lenin Komsomol Prize
Recipients of the Order of Lenin
Recipients of the Order of the Red Banner of Labour
Recipients of the Order of the Red Star
Recipients of the USSR State Prize
Burials at Novodevichy Cemetery